Vernon County  may refer to:

Places
 Vernon County, New South Wales, Australia
 Vernon County, Missouri, U.S.
 Vernon County, Wisconsin, U.S.
 Vernon Parish, Louisiana, U.S.

Other uses 
 USS Vernon County (LST-1161), a United States Navy tank landing ship in commission from 1953 to 1973

See also
 Vernon County Courthouse (disambiguation)